XMT can refer to:

 Extensible MPEG-4 Textual Format, an XML-based file format for storing MPEG-4 data in a way suitable for further editing
 Explicit multi-threading, a parallel computing paradigm designed around the parallel random-access machine
 Cray XMT - a multithreaded supercomputing architecture, the successor to the Cray MTA-2
 8-hydroxyfuranocoumarin 8-O-methyltransferase, an enzyme